Fred Farrington (1867 – 1924) was an English footballer who played at half-back for Burslem Port Vale between 1888 and 1894. He served as club captain in the 1892–93 season.

Career
Farrington probably joined Burslem Port Vale in the autumn of 1888. He took four years to establish himself in the first team, but was a regular in the first team from March 1892, and played in the 1892 Staffordshire Charity Cup victory. He was appointed as club captain for the 1892–93 season, as the club became founder members of the Football League Second Division. He scored two goals in a 4–1 win over Crewe Alexandra at the Athletic Ground on 24 September. He also claimed goals against Burton Swifts and Darwen to finish the campaign with four goals in 18 league games. He featured just five times in the 1893–94 season, and retired due to ill health in April 1894.

Career statistics
Source:

Honours
Port Vale
Staffordshire Charity Cup: 1892

References

1867 births
1924 deaths
Sportspeople from Newcastle-under-Lyme
English footballers
Association football midfielders
Port Vale F.C. players
English Football League players